Learnmore Mwanyenyeka (born 22 August 1993) formerly known as Long John the Comedian and now known professionally as Learnmore Jonasi, is a Zimbabwean stand-up comedian, actor and MC. He is also known as "The Village Boy" and has won the 2019 National Arts Merit Awards as the Outstanding Comedian of the Year and the 2019 Savanna Comic Choice Awards as the Pan African Comic of the Year. He was people's choice award winner in Steve Harvey's Stand Up Spotlight competition in 2019. In 2020 he won the National Arts Merit Awards as the Outstanding Comedian of the Year.

Early life and education

1993 - 2010 
Learnmore was born 22 August 1993 as Learnmore Mwenyeyeka at Dangamvura Hospital in Mutare, Manicaland, Zimbabwe. He never met his father and does not know his name. His mother, Memory Mwanyenyeka, is a Kindergarten teacher in South Africa. He was raised by his grandparents, Partson Mwanyenyeka, a government pensioner and Lillian Mwanyenyeka in Chimanimani.

During the years 1999 to 2000, he  went to Chimanimani Primary School  between Grade 1 and 2. When his grandfather was retrenched from work, in 2000, they moved to Mutare where he continued his education at Sheni Primary School from Grade 3 up to the time he sat his ZIMSEC Grade 7 Certificate. In 2006, he joined Chimanimani High School, and in 2010, he sat his ZIMSEC General Certificate of Education Ordinary Level.

Career

2011 - present 
After completing his O level in 2010, he went to Harare to start his comedic journey but he did not have any relatives there where he could stay. In 2011 he traveled to Bulawayo to find a comedy club but found none. In 2012 he left for Harare where he performed for the first time on 9 October 2012 at the Simuka Comedy Night hosted at Book café. He was booed by the audience. For almost two years, he couldn't make people laugh at the open mic yet he kept coming back every Monday to perform.

In 2014, he then went back to Bulawayo, where a new comedy club called Umahlekisa had been formed. He was helped by the founder, Ntando Van Moyo with stage time and honing skills to be a better comedian. He became affectionately known as "The Village Boy from Chimanimani" because of his village jokes. In October 2014, he began his first international  tour in South Africa at The Box Comedy Club hosted at Pop Art Theatre Johannesburg.

In December 2015 he performed his first  one man show titled The Longest Yard at Alliance Francaise Harare.

27 February 2016 was the first time he opened for Barry Hilton. In the same year, he was invited to perform at the African Comedy Festival at the Hippodrum Auditorium in Golders Green in the United Kingdom. While in the United Kingdom, he did a course with Laughing Horse to improve on his skills. On 22 June 2016, he hosted his second one man show titled The Village boy at the Reps Theatre in Harare, Zimbabwe.

On 27 April 2017, Learnmore  performed in a three day comedy festival at the Swaziland International Comedy Festival, hosted by Chigubu. On 2 March 2018 he headlined the Major Moves Comedy  Nights in Botswana at Zambezi Towers. On 29 June, he performed in Uganda at the Kampala Comedy Festival, hosted by Okello Okello.  In July 2018, he performed in Rwanda at the Kigali International Comedy Festival along several Ugandans and Daliso Chaponda.

In April 2019, Learnmore  headlined at the Free Your Mind's (FYM) monthly stand-up comedy show, hosted by Courage the Comedian in Namibia. In the same month, he won the National Arts Merit Awards (NAMA). On 3 May 2019 he performed at the Hicofest, in Botswana. On 7 September 2019 he won the Pan African Comic of The Year Awards at the 9th South African Savannah Comics Choice Awards in Johannesburg, South Africa at the Lyric Theatre. He dedicated his award to the people affected by Cyclone Idai that hit the Eastern Highlands of Zimbabwe in March. In November, he was the people's choice award winner in the Steve Harvey's Stand Up Spotlight Competition.

In March 2020 he won his second NAMA Award as Outstanding Comedian of the Year. In October 2020, Learnmore  won the Best Stand up Comedy Award at the All The Laughs Comedy Awards hosted in Atlanta. He was then nominated in three categories; People's Choice Awards, Outstanding Achievement in Entertainment and Male Personality of the Year for in the 6th annual Zimbabwe Achievers Awards South Africa (ZAA SA) and he won as Male Personality of the Year during the award ceremony in December.

In 2021, Learnmore  was part of the cast of the second season of Savanna Virtual Comedy Bar hosted by Comedy Central on DStv.

One Man Shows 
 2015 - The Longest Yard
 2016 - The Village Boy

Genres 
Self-deprecation comedy
Situational comedy

Filmography

Television

Awards and nominations

References

External links 
Learnmore  on Facebook

Zimbabwean comedians
Living people
1993 births
People from Mutare